WQYZ (92.5 MHz "Rock 92.5") is a commercial FM radio station licensed to Ocean Springs, Mississippi, and serving the Biloxi-Gulfport radio market.  It airs a hard-edged classic rock format and is owned by iHeartMedia, Inc.  Core artists include AC/DC, Metallica, Pearl Jam and Van Halen.  WQYZ is the Biloxi-Gulfport affiliate for Rover's Morning Glory, a syndicated morning show from sister station WMMS in Cleveland, hosted by Shane French, known as Rover.

WQYZ has an effective radiated power (ERP) of 6,000 watts, as a Class A FM station.  The transmitter is off Big Ridge Road in St. Martin, Mississippi, near Interstate 10.

History
On September 1, 1992, the station signed on as WWXX.  It was owned by Golden Gulf Coast Broadcasting with its studios and offices in Biloxi.  It later switched to the call sign WXCR as a Contemporary Christian music station.  In 1998, the call letters flipped to WQYZ with an urban adult contemporary format.

On October 25, 2017, at 7 p.m., WQYZ dropped its urban AC format (branded as "92.5 The Beat") and began stunting as "Roulette Radio."  On October 31, WQYZ flipped to classic rock, branded as "Rock 92.5.  In 2022 WQYZ dropped Rover's morning glory for Walton & Johnson morning show."

References

External links
WQYZ official website

QYZ
IHeartMedia radio stations
Classic rock radio stations in the United States